Brian Lawton (born 9 December 1988) is an Irish hurler who plays as a left wing-forward for club side Castlemartyr, divisional side Imokilly and at inter-county level with the Cork senior hurling team.

Playing career

College

Lawton first came to prominence as a hurler with Midleton CBS Secondary School. Having played for the various college team in every grade, he was at midfield on the senior team. On 12 March 2006, Lawton won a Harty Cup medal after a 2-08 to 0-12 defeat of St. Flannan's College.

University

During his studies at University College Cork, Lawton enjoyed success as a hurler, beginning with an All-Ireland Freshers Championship title in his first year. On 2 March 2013, he won a Fitzgibbon Cup medal after a 2-17 to 2-12 defeat of Mary Immaculate College in the final.

Club

Lawton joined the Castlemartyr club at a young age and played in all grades at juvenile and underage levels. As a member of the club's top adult team, he won four East Cork Junior Championship medals in six seasons. On 26 October 2014, Lawton was at centre-forward when Castlemartyr won the Cork Junior Championship after an 0-18 to 0-10 defeat of Ballinhassig.

Lawton's performances for his club in the junior grade saw him added to the Imokilly team and he has been a regular member of the team for over a decade. On 22 October 2017, he lined out at right wing-forward in the senior championship final. Lawton scored two points, including a sideline, in Imokilly's 3-13 to 0-18 defeat of Blackrock.

Inter-county

Intermediate

Lawton first played for Cork at intermediate level and made his first appearance for the team on 31 May 2009 when he came on as a substitute against Tipperary. He later won a Munster medal as a non-playing substitute after a 5-24 to 3-09 defeat of Waterford in the final. On 29 August 2009, Lawton was an unused substitute when Cork defeated Kilkenny by 2-23 to 0-16 in the All-Ireland final. He won a second successive Munster medal in 2010, scoring a point after being introduced as a substitute in a second successive defeat of Watreford in the final. On 28 August 2010, Lawton was introduced as a substitute in the 53rd minute of Cork's All-Ireland final defeat by Kilkenny.

Senior

Lawton made his senior debut for Cork on 9 March 2014, replacing Conor Lehane in the 53rd minute of a National League game against Offaly at Páirc Uí Rinn. He made several appearances throughout the league and subsequent championship. On 13 July 2014, Lawton won his first Munster medal as an unused substitute after a six-point defeat of Limeric in the finalk. 

On 9 July 2017, Lawton won his second Munster medal following a 1-25 to 1-20 defeat of Clare in the final.

On 1 July 2018, Lawton won a third Munster medal after a 2-24 to 3-19 defeat of Clare in the final.

Career statistics

Club

Inter-county

Honours

Midleton CBS
Harty Cup: 2006

University College Cork
Fitzgibbon Cup: 2013
All-Ireland Freshers' Hurling Championship: 2007

Castlemartyr
Cork Lower Intermediate Hurling Championship: 2020 (c)
Cork Junior Hurling Championship: 2014
East Cork Junior A Hurling Championship: 2009, 2010, 2013, 2014

Imokilly
Cork Senior Hurling Championship: 2017

Cork
Munster Senior Hurling Championship: 2014, 2017, 2018
All-Ireland Intermediate Hurling Championship: 2009
Munster Intermediate Hurling Championship: 2009, 2010

References

External links

Brian Lawton profile at the Cork GAA website

1988 births
Living people
Castlemartyr hurlers
UCC hurlers
Imokilly hurlers
Cork inter-county hurlers